Sohbat Khan is a village in the Balochistan province of Pakistan. It is located at 27°46'0N 67°44'10E with an altitude of 32 metres (108 feet).

References

Populated places in Balochistan, Pakistan